Ridgeway High School may refer to:

Ridgeway High School (Birkenhead) in Merseyside, England
Ridgeway High School (Memphis, Tennessee) in the United States of America